Alla Levonyan (born June 26, 1975) is an Armenian singer, who is a recipient of the Honorary Worker of Culture of the Republic of Armenia award, which is an honorary title in Armenia. In 2007, she was appointed the UNICEF Armenia Goodwill Ambassador.

Awards and titles 
Distinguished Artist of the Republic of Armenia (2011) 
"The Best Singer"
"The Best People's Singer"
"Best Song, CD," and more.
The Gold Medal of the RA Ministry of Culture
RA Ministry of Defense "Vazgen Sargsyan" Medal

Discography
Hayastan (2000)
Msho Aghchik (2002)
Gnam Hasnem (2003)
The Best (2006)
Maral (2006)

Filmography

References

External links 
Alla Levonyan

1975 births
21st-century Armenian women singers
Komitas State Conservatory of Yerevan alumni
Living people
Honored artists of Armenia